Energy Storage Materials is a peer-reviewed scientific journal by Elsevier BV.

Abstracting and indexing 
Energy Storage Materials is abstracted and indexed the following bibliographic databases:
Science Citation Index Expanded
Scopus
INSPEC

According to the Journal Citation Reports, the journal has a 2020 impact factor of 17.789.

References

External links 
 

English-language journals
Elsevier academic journals